Birungi is a surname. Notable people with the surname include: 

Barbara Birungi (born 1986), Ugandan technologist
Grace Birungi (born 1973), Ugandan runner
Irene Birungi (born 1973), Ugandan entrepreneur, broadcaster, and columnist
Patrick Birungi (born 1968), Ugandan economist